Christine Forage  is an Indian athlete. She won a bronze medal in long jump in 1966 Asian Games.

References

Athletes (track and field) at the 1966 Asian Games
Asian Games bronze medalists for India
Asian Games medalists in athletics (track and field)
Possibly living people
Year of birth missing
Medalists at the 1966 Asian Games